Glendale is a suburb of Wainuiomata, part of Lower Hutt city situated in the lower North Island of New Zealand.

Demographics

Glendale had a population of 4,050 at the 2018 New Zealand census, an increase of 249 people (6.6%) since the 2013 census, and an increase of 417 people (11.5%) since the 2006 census. There were 1,233 households. There were 2,004 males and 2,049 females, giving a sex ratio of 0.98 males per female. The median age was 31.7 years (compared with 37.4 years nationally), with 999 people (24.7%) aged under 15 years, 909 (22.4%) aged 15 to 29, 1,779 (43.9%) aged 30 to 64, and 363 (9.0%) aged 65 or older.

Ethnicities were 63.3% European/Pākehā, 37.0% Māori, 16.8% Pacific peoples, 7.4% Asian, and 2.5% other ethnicities (totals add to more than 100% since people could identify with multiple ethnicities).

The proportion of people born overseas was 15.9%, compared with 27.1% nationally.

Although some people objected to giving their religion, 49.0% had no religion, 36.2% were Christian, 2.2% were Hindu, 0.7% were Muslim, 0.3% were Buddhist and 3.9% had other religions.

Of those at least 15 years old, 318 (10.4%) people had a bachelor or higher degree, and 759 (24.9%) people had no formal qualifications. The median income was $32,200, compared with $31,800 nationally. The employment status of those at least 15 was that 1,683 (55.2%) people were employed full-time, 354 (11.6%) were part-time, and 201 (6.6%) were unemployed.

Education
Pukeatua Primary School is a state full primary (Year 1–8) school, and has  students as of  It was established in 2002 following the merger of Glendale School and Pencarrow School.

References

Suburbs of Lower Hutt